The Lure of the Sawdust is a 1914 American silent drama short directed by Tom Ricketts starring Charlotte Burton, George Field, Ed Coxen, Edith Borella, Ida Lewis and John Steppling.

External links

1914 drama films
1914 short films
1914 films
Silent American drama films
American silent short films
American black-and-white films
Films directed by Tom Ricketts
1910s American films